The 1982–83 season was the 84th season for FC Barcelona.

Squad

Competitions

Friendlies

La Liga

League table

Matches

European Cup Winners' Cup

Second round

Eightfinals

Quarterfinals

European Super Cup

Copa del Rey

Eightfinals

Quarterfinals

Semifinals

Final

Copa de la Liga

References

External links

webdelcule.com

FC Barcelona seasons
Barcelona